Bandar Indah Jaya is one of the satellite towns of Sandakan in the Malaysian state of Sabah.

It has many facilities, such as restaurants, mobile phone shops, a departmental store, a fast-food outlet (A & W), and many more facilities within Bandar Indah Jaya and its vicinity.

References 

Sandakan District
Towns in Sabah